Tetratheca rupicola is a species of plant in the quandong family that is endemic to Australia.

Description
The species grows as a compact or diffuse shrub to 20–40 cm in height. The solitary pink flowers have petals 6–15 mm long, appearing from October to December.

Distribution and habitat
The plants grow in sandy and rocky soils in heath and sclerophyll forest in the Blue Mountains of central eastern New South Wales.

References

rupicola
Flora of New South Wales
Oxalidales of Australia
Taxa named by Joy Thompson
Plants described in 1976